Newcastle Breakers FC are a defunct Australian football (soccer) club. Formed out of elements of the Newcastle Austral club, they participated in the National Soccer League from season 1991/1992, until their dissolution in 1999/2000. The club fared poorly on the field in its nine seasons in the national league, failing to reach the finals at every attempt. The club's demise led to the creation of Newcastle United FC (later known as Newcastle Jets).

Notable former players

Notable former coaches
  John Kosmina
  Lee Sterrey

References

Association football clubs established in 1991
Association football clubs disestablished in 2000
Defunct soccer clubs in Australia
National Soccer League (Australia) teams
Soccer clubs in Newcastle, New South Wales
1991 establishments in Australia
2000 disestablishments in Australia